Access International Academy Ningbo (AIAN) is an international school in the Beilun District of Ningbo, China offering educational programs from Nursery to Grade 12 to students of 28 nationalities. AIAN is the only international school in Ningbo accredited by the Western Association of Schools and Colleges (WASC).

AIAN is a member of the Association of China and Mongolia International Schools (ACAMIS) and the East Asia Regional Council of Overseas Schools (EARCOS).

References

Zhejiang Province

International schools in China
Association of China and Mongolia International Schools
Educational institutions established in 2002
2002 establishments in China